This list is a discography of The Bartered Bride (German: Die verkaufte Braut) by Bedřich Smetana. The opera was first performed, in its original two-act format, at the Provisional Theatre, Prague, on 30 May 1866. After substantial revisions it was premiered in its extended three-act form at the Provisional Theatre on 25 September 1870.

The first complete recording of the opera was issued in 1933. Numerous recordings have since been made, in the original Czech language, in German and in English. The list includes both studio recordings and live performances, but not excerpts or highlights. "Year" refers to the year of the original recording; in the case of reissues, the Label and Catalogue No. generally relate to the most recent CD version. Unless stated otherwise, the language is Czech.

Audio recordings

Video recordings

References
Notes

Sources
 

 

Opera discographies
Operas by Bedřich Smetana